Heffingen is a commune and small town in central Luxembourg, in the canton of Mersch.

, the town of Heffingen, which lies in the centre of the commune, has a population of 598.  Another town within the commune is Reuland. Heffingen is where Loschbour man, a homo sapiens of over 8000 years old, was found.

Population

References

External links
 

Communes in Mersch (canton)
Towns in Luxembourg